John Frederick Dewey FRS (born 22 May 1937) is a British structural geologist and a strong proponent of the theory of plate tectonics, building upon the early work undertaken in the 1960s and 1970s. He is widely regarded as an authority on the development and evolution of mountain ranges.

Biography 
Dewey was educated at Bancroft's School and Queen Mary and Imperial College at the University of London where he was awarded a BSc and PhD in geology. Following a period as lecturer at the University of Manchester (1960–64), the University of Cambridge (1964–1970) and Memorial University of Newfoundland (1971), Dewey was appointed Professor of Geology at the State University of New York at Albany. During this period he produced a series of classic papers centred on the history of the Appalachians in Newfoundland as well as the Scottish and Irish Caledonides. In later years, his research has concentrated upon producing a model to describe the development and orogenic history of the Himalayan mountain range.

Dewey returned to the UK in 1982 as Professor of Geology at the University of Durham, a position he held for four years. As with another Durham geologists before him, Lawrence Wager, Dewey was appointed Professor of Geology at the University of Oxford (and Fellow of University College) in 1986, a position he held until his resignation in 2000. Since then he has returned to the US as Professor of Geology at the University of California at Davis, although he maintains a position as Senior Research Fellow at University College, Oxford.

John Dewey was elected a Fellow of the Royal Society of London (FRS) in 1985 and has received numerous medals and awards, notably the Wollaston Medal of the Geological Society of London (that society's highest award) in 1999 and the Penrose Medal of the Geological Society of America (1992). Dewey was elected to the United States National Academy of Sciences in 1997., is a Member of the Royal Irish Academy and is a Corresponding Member of the Australian Academy of Science (2011).

Selected publications

References

External links
 Dewey's page on University of California at Davis site

1937 births
Living people
20th-century British geologists
Fellows of the Royal Society
Fellows of University College, Oxford
Penrose Medal winners
People educated at Bancroft's School
Alumni of Queen Mary University of London
Alumni of Imperial College London
University at Albany, SUNY faculty
Academics of Durham University
Wollaston Medal winners
Lyell Medal winners
Foreign associates of the National Academy of Sciences
University of California, Davis faculty
Structural geologists
21st-century British geologists